Rhea Katrina Karla Dimaculangan (born March 21, 1991) is a Filipino professional indoor volleyball athlete, and a former member of the Philippines women national volleyball team and the club Petron Tri-Activ Spikers. Dimaculangan played setter for and was a former captain of the UST Golden Tigresses.

Personal life
Dimaculangan was born in a family of five siblings in Batangas. She is the younger sister of Ray Karl Dimaculangan, also a volleyball player and used to play as a setter for the men's volleyball team of the UST Golden Tigers.

Career

Beginnings
Dimaculangan started her career in volleyball early in her elementary days in De La Salle Lipa. She was originally a hitter for her team, and only transitioned into her current position in 5th grade.

Collegiate days
She moved in the University of Santo Tomas High School for her high school education where she became the playmaker for the girls' volleyball team. Later on, she pursued her tertiary education in University of Santo Tomas, majoring in Sports Science under UST-CRS, and continuing with the UST Golden Tigresses.

In 2009–2010, the UST Golden Tigresses achieved a historic "Grand Slam" after sweeping the major Philippine collegiate women's volleyball conferences. (Shakey's V-League Season 6 1st Conference and 2nd Conference, the 2009 University Games, and UAAP Season 72).

In UAAP Season 72 where her team won the championship, she claimed the Best Server and Final's Most Valuable Player award .

Post-graduate career

Shakey's V-League
Dimaculangan also made a name in several Shakey's V-League conferences. In Shakey's V-League Season 6 1st Conference, she was entitled the Final's Most Valuable Player and Best Setter. She also snatched the Best Setter award in Shakey's V- League Season 11, Open Conference.

Philippine Super Liga
Dimaculangan's debut in the Philippine Super Liga was in the 2014 Philippine Super Liga All-Filipino league where she snatched the Best Setter award and led her team, RC Cola Air Force Raiders, to a championship silver medal.

She then transferred to the club team Foton Tornadoes together with Maika Ortiz in mid-2015 where she brought the team into a first-runner up finish in the 2015 Philippine Super Liga All-Filipino. With the aid of the imports Lindsay Stalzer and Ariel Usher, she helped the team bag its second championship gold medal in the 2016 PSL Grand Prix Conference.

Early 2017, Dimaculangan moved clubs and signed a year contract with the Petron Tri-Activ Spikers. With Petron Blaze Spikers, she won the 2017 PSL Grand Prix Conference silver medal. The following year, she together with Lindsay Stalzer, Katherine Bell and Aiza Maizo-Pontillas led Petron to the 2018 PSL Grand Prix Conference championship. Dimaculangan won the Most Valuable Player award of the 2018 PSL All-Filipino Conference.

Awards

Individuals
 UAAP Season 72 "Final's Most Valuable Player"
 UAAP Season 72 "Best Server"
 Shakey's V- League Season 6, 1st Conference "Final's Most Valuable Player"
 Shakey's V- League Season 6, 1st Conference "Best Setter"
 Shakey's V- League Season 11, Open Conference "Best Setter"
 2014 PSL All-Filipino "Best Setter"
 2017 PSL All-Filipino "Best Setter"
 2018 PSL All-Filipino "Most Valuable Player"
 2019 PSL Grand Prix "Best Setter"

Clubs
 UAAP Season 70 -  2nd Runner-Up, with UST Golden Tigresses
 2008 Shakey's V-League 2nd Conference -  1st Runner-Up, with UST Golden Tigresses
 UAAP Season 71 -  2nd Runner-Up, with UST Golden Tigresses
 2009 Shakey's V-League 1st Conference -  Champion, with UST Golden Tigresses
 2009 Shakey's V-League 2nd Conference -  Champion, with UST Golden Tigresses
 2009 University Games -  Champion, with UST Golden Tigresses 
 UAAP Season 72 -  Champion, with UST Golden Tigresses
 2010 Shakey's V-League 1st Conference -  Champion, with UST Golden Tigresses
 UAAP Season 73 -  1st Runner-Up, with UST Golden Tigresses
 UAAP Season 74 -  2nd Runner-Up, with UST Golden Tigresses
 2016 Philippine SuperLiga All-Filipino Conference -   1st Runner-up, with Foton Tornadoes
 2016 Philippine SuperLiga Grand Prix -   Champion, with Foton Tornadoes
 2017 Philippine Super Liga Invitational Cup -  1st Runner-up, with Petron Tri-Activ Spikers
 2017 Philippine SuperLiga All-Filipino Conference -  Champion, with Petron Blaze Spikers
 2017 Philippine SuperLiga Grand Prix Conference -  1st Runner-up, with Petron Blaze Spikers
 2018 Philippine SuperLiga Grand Prix Conference -  Champion, with Petron Blaze Spikers
 2018 Philippine SuperLiga All-Filipino Conference -  Champion, with Petron Blaze Spikers

References

External links
 Rhea Dimaculangan | Volleyverse

Living people
University of Santo Tomas alumni
University Athletic Association of the Philippines volleyball players
1991 births
Setters (volleyball)
Philippines women's international volleyball players
Filipino women's volleyball players
Sportspeople from Batangas
Academic staff of De La Salle University
Competitors at the 2017 Southeast Asian Games
Competitors at the 2019 Southeast Asian Games
Southeast Asian Games competitors for the Philippines